The demographics of New Zealand encompass the gender, ethnic, religious, geographic, and economic backgrounds of the 5.1 million people living in New Zealand. New Zealanders predominantly live in urban areas on the North Island. The five largest cities are Auckland, Wellington, Christchurch, Hamilton, and Tauranga. Few New Zealanders live on New Zealand's smaller islands. Waiheke Island (near Auckland) is easily the most populated smaller island with  residents, while Great Barrier Island, the Chatham and Pitt Islands, and Stewart Island each have populations below 1,000. New Zealand is part of a realm and most people born in the realm's external territories of Tokelau, the Ross Dependency, the Cook Islands and Niue are entitled to New Zealand passports.

As at the 2018 census, the majority of New Zealand's population is of European descent (70 percent), with the indigenous Māori being the largest minority (16.5 percent), followed by Asians (15.3 percent), and non-Māori Pacific Islanders known collectively as Pasifika (9.0 percent). This is reflected in immigration, with most new migrants coming from Britain and Ireland, although the numbers from Asia in particular are increasing. Auckland is the most ethnically diverse region in New Zealand with 53.5 percent identifying as Europeans, 28.2 percent as Asian, 11.5 percent as Māori, 15.5 percent as Pacific Islanders, and 2.3 percent as Middle Eastern, Latin American or African (MELAA).

English, Māori and New Zealand Sign Language are the official languages, with English predominant. New Zealand English is mostly non-rhotic and sounds similar to Australian English, with a common exception being the centralisation of the short i. The Māori language has undergone a process of revitalisation and is spoken by 4 percent of the population. New Zealand has an adult literacy rate of 99 percent and over half of the population aged 15–29 hold a tertiary qualification. In the adult population 14.2 percent have a bachelor's degree or higher, 30.4 percent have some form of secondary qualification as their highest qualification and 22.4 percent have no formal qualification. As at the 2018 census, 37 percent of the population identify as Christians, with Hinduism and Buddhism being the largest minority religions; almost half of the population (48.5 percent) is irreligious.

Farming is a major occupation in New Zealand, although more people are employed as sales assistants. Most New Zealanders earn wage or salary income, with a median weekly income in 2022 of NZ$848.

Terminology

While the demonym for a New Zealand citizen is New Zealander, the informal "Kiwi" is commonly used both internationally and by locals. The name derives from the kiwi, a native flightless bird, which is the national symbol of New Zealand. The Māori loanword "Pākehā" usually refers to New Zealanders of European descent, although some reject this appellation, and some Māori use it to refer to all non-Polynesian New Zealanders. Most people born in New Zealand or one of the realm's external territories (Tokelau, the Ross Dependency, the Cook Islands and Niue) before 2006 are New Zealand citizens. Further conditions apply for those born from 2006 onwards.

Population

The 2018 census enumerated a resident population of 4,699,755 – a 10.8 percent increase over the population recorded in the 2013 census. The population is increasing at a rate of 1.4–2.0 percent per year. In May 2020, Statistics New Zealand reported that New Zealand's population had climbed above 5 million people in March 2020; in September 2020, this was revised six months earlier to September 2019 when population estimates were rebased to the 2018 census.

The median child birthing age was 30 and the total fertility rate is 2.1 births per woman in 2010. In Māori populations the median age is 26 and fertility rate 2.8. In 2010 the age-standardised mortality rate was 3.8 deaths per 1000 (down from 4.8 in 2000) and the infant mortality rate for the total population was 5.1 deaths per 1000 live births. The life expectancy of a New Zealand child born in 2014-16 was 83.4 years for females, and 79.9 years for males, which is among the highest in the world. Life expectancy at birth is forecast to increase from 80 years to 85 years in 2050 and infant mortality is expected to decline. In 2050 the median age is forecast to rise from 36 years to 43 years and the percentage of people 60 years of age and older rising from 18 percent to 29 percent. During early migration in 1858, New Zealand had 131 males for every 100 females, but following changes in migration patterns and the modern longevity advantage of women, females came to outnumber males in 1971. As of 2012 there are 0.99 males per female, with males dominating under 15 years and females dominating in the 65 years or older range.

Vital statistics

Age structure 

The age structure of New Zealand is getting increasingly older. Due to undergoing the demographic transition from a 'pre-industrial' age structure to a 'post-industrial' age structure, the country has a sub-replacement fertility rate which is consequently leading to an older population and more evenly balanced population pyramid.

The average age of the citizen has gone from 25.8 years old in 1965 to 38 in 2020 and is projected to rise to 43.7 years old in 2050. The population of 90 year olds is also expected to rise dramatically, in the 1930's there was a approximately 1,000 90+ year olds, in 2016 it had risen to 29,000, in 2030 it is expected to exceed 50,000 and by the 2060's it is to rise above 180,000 people.

Population density

New Zealand's population density is relatively low, at   The vast majority of the population live on the main North and South Islands, with New Zealand's major inhabited smaller islands being Waiheke Island, the Chatham and Pitt Islands, and Stewart Island (381). Over three-quarters of the population live in the North Island ( percent), with one-third of the total population living in the Auckland Region. Most Māori live in the North Island (86.0 percent), although less than a quarter (23.8 percent) live in Auckland.

New Zealand is a predominantly urban country, with  percent of the population living in an urban area. About  percent of the population live in the 20 main urban areas (population of 30,000 or more) and  percent live in the four largest cities of Auckland, Christchurch, Wellington, and Hamilton.

Approximately 14 percent of the population live in four different categories of rural areas as defined by Statistics New Zealand. About 18 percent of the rural population live in areas that have a high urban influence (roughly 12.9 people per square kilometre), many working in the main urban area. Rural areas with moderate urban influence and a population density of about 6.5 people per square kilometre account for 26 percent of the rural population. Areas with low urban influence where the majority of the residents work in the rural area house approximately 42 percent of the rural population. Remote rural areas with a density of less than 1 person per square kilometre account for about 14 percent of the rural population.

Before local government reforms in the late 1980s, a borough council with more than 20,000 people could be proclaimed a city. The boundaries of councils tended to follow the edge of the built-up area, so there was little difference between the urban area and the local government area. In 1989, all councils were consolidated into regional councils (top tier) and territorial authorities (second tier) which cover a much wider area and population than the old city councils. Today a territorial authority must have a predominantly urban population of at least 50,000 before it can be officially recognised as a city.

Migration

East Polynesians were the first people to reach New Zealand about 1280, followed by the early European explorers, notably James Cook in 1769 who explored New Zealand three times and mapped the coastline. Following the Treaty of Waitangi in 1840 when the country became a British colony, immigrants were predominantly from Britain, Ireland and Australia. Due to restrictive policies, limitations were placed on non-European immigrants. During the gold rush period (1858–1880s) large number of young men came from California and Victoria to New Zealand goldfields. Apart from British, there were Irish, Germans, Scandinavians, Italians and many Chinese. The Chinese were sent special invitations by the Otago Chamber of Commerce in 1866. By 1873 they made up 40 percent of the diggers in Otago and 25 percent of the diggers in Westland. From 1900 there was also significant Dutch, Dalmatian, and Italian immigration together with indirect European immigration through Australia, North America, South America and South Africa. Following World War II, policies were relaxed and migrant diversity increased. In 2008–09, a target of 45,000 migrants was set by the New Zealand Immigration Service (plus a 5,000 tolerance).

At the 2018 census, 27.4 percent of people counted were not born in New Zealand, up from 25.2 percent in 2013. In 2018, over half (50.7 percent) of New Zealand's overseas-born population lived in the Auckland Region, including 70 percent of the country's Pacific Island-born population, 61.5 percent of its Asian-born population, and 52 percent of its Middle Eastern and African- born population. In the late 2000s, Asia overtook the British Isles as the largest source of overseas migrants; in 2013 around 32 percent of overseas-born New Zealand residents were born in Asia (mainly China, India, the Philippines and South Korea) compared to 26 percent born in the UK and Ireland. The number of fee-paying international students increased sharply in the late 1990s, with more than 20,000 studying in public tertiary institutions in 2002.

To be eligible for entry under the skilled migrant plan applicants are assessed by an approved doctor for good health, provide a police certificate to prove good character and speak sufficient English. Migrants working in some occupations (mainly health) must be registered with the appropriate profession body before they can work within that area. Skilled migrants are assessed by Immigration New Zealand and applicants that they believe will contribute are issued with a residential visa, while those with potential are issued with a work to resident visa. Under the work to residency process applicants are given a temporary work permit for two years and are then eligible to apply for residency. Applicants with a job offer from an accredited New Zealand employer, cultural or sporting talent, looking for work where there has been a long-term skill shortage or to establish a business can apply for work to residency.

While most New Zealanders live in New Zealand, there is also a significant diaspora abroad, estimated as of 2001 at over 460,000 or 14 percent of the international total of New Zealand-born. Of these, 360,000, over three-quarters of the New Zealand-born population residing outside of New Zealand, live in Australia. Other communities of New Zealanders abroad are concentrated in other English-speaking countries, specifically the United Kingdom, the United States and Canada, with smaller numbers located elsewhere. Nearly one quarter of New Zealand's highly skilled workers live overseas, mostly in Australia and Britain, more than any other developed nation. However many educated professionals from Europe and lesser developed countries have recently migrated to New Zealand. A common pathway for New Zealanders to move to the UK is through a job offer via the Tier 2 (General) visa, which grants a 3-year initial stay in the country and can later be extended with three more years. After 5 years the person can apply for permanent residency. Another popular option is the UK Working Holiday visa, also known as "Youth Mobility Scheme" (YMS), which grants New Zealanders 2-year rights to live and work in the UK.

Ethnicity

New Zealand is a multiethnic society, and home to people of many different national origins. Originally composed solely of the Māori who arrived in the thirteenth century, the ethnic makeup of the population later became dominated by New Zealanders of European descent. In the nineteenth century, European settlers brought diseases for which the Māori had no immunity. By the 1890s, the Māori population was approximately 40 percent of its size pre-contact. The Māori population increased during the twentieth century, though it remains a minority.  The 1961 New Zealand census recorded that the population was 92 percent European and 7 percent Māori, with Asian and Pasifika minorities sharing the remaining 1 percent.

At the latest census in 2018, 70.2 percent identified as European, 16.5 percent as Māori, 15.1 percent as Asian, 8.1 percent as Pacific peoples, and 1.2 percent as Middle-Eastern, Latin American, and African (MELAA). Most New Zealanders are of English, Scottish, and Irish ancestry, with smaller percentages of other European ancestries, such as Dutch, Dalmatian, French, German and Scandinavian. Auckland was the most diverse region with 53.5 percent identifying as European, 28.2 percent as Asian, 11.5 percent as Māori, 15.5 percent as Pacific Islanders and 1.1 percent as MELAA.

All major ethnic groups except European increased when compared with the 2013 census, in which 74 percent identified as European, 14.6 percent as Māori, 11.8 percent as Asian, and 7.4 percent of Pacific Islander origin. Heightened immigration from Asia and the Pacific, and higher fertility rates amongst Māori and Pacific peoples, have resulted in the population of Māori, Asian and Pacific descent growing at a higher rate than those of European descent. Moreover, non-European ethnic groups make up a greater proportion of younger people, whereas European ethnic groups make up a large proportion of older people due to historic immigration trends and lower life expectancy in Māori and Pacific ethnic groups. For instance, in 2013, the population aged under 15 years was 67 percent European, 27 percent Māori, 14 percent Pacific, 16 percent Asian, and 2 percent MELAA, while the population aged 65 years and older consisted of 86 percent European, 7 percent Māori, 6 percent Asian and 3 percent Pacific.

There was significant public discussion about usage of the term "New Zealander" during the months leading up to the 2006 census. The number of people identifying with this term increased from approximately 80,000 (2.4 percent) in 2001 to just under 430,000 people (11.1 percent) in 2006. The European grouping significantly decreased from 80.0 percent of the population in 2001 to 67.6 percent in 2006, however, this is broadly proportional to the large increase in "New Zealanders". The number of people identifying as a "New Zealander" dropped back to under 66,000 in 2013, and further declined to about 45,300 in 2018.

Statistics New Zealand has not released official statistical counts of Māori iwi (tribes) from the 2018 census due to a low response rate. As last recorded in the 2013 census, the largest iwi is Ngāpuhi with 125,601 people (or 18.8 percent of people of Māori descent). Between 2006 and 2013 the number of people of Māori descent stating Ngāpuhi as their iwi increased by 3,390 people (2.8 percent). The second-largest was Ngāti Porou, with 71,049 people (down 1.2 percent from 2006). Ngāi Tahu was the largest in the South Island and the third-largest overall, with a count of 54,819 people (an increase of 11.4 percent from 2006). A total of 110,928 people (or 18.5 percent) of Māori descent did not know their iwi (an increase of 8.4 percent compared with 2006). A group of Māori migrated to Rēkohu, now known as the Chatham Islands, where they developed their distinct Moriori culture. The Moriori population was decimated, first, by disease brought by European sealers and whalers and, second, by Taranaki Māori, with only 101 surviving in 1862 and the last known full-blooded Moriori dying in 1933. The number of people identifying as having Moriori descents increased from 105 in 1991 to 945 in 2006, but decreased to 738 in 2013.

The maps below (taken from 2013 census data) show the percentages of people in each census area unit identifying themselves as European, Māori, Asian, or Pacific Islander (as defined by Statistics New Zealand). As people could identify themselves with multiple groups, percentages are not cumulative.

Language

English has long been entrenched as a de facto national language due to its widespread use. In the 2018 census, 95.4 percent of respondents spoke English, down from 96.1 percent in 2013. The New Zealand English dialect is mostly non-rhotic with an exception being the Southern Burr found principally in Southland and parts of Otago. It is similar to Australian English and many speakers from the Northern Hemisphere are unable to tell the accents apart. In New Zealand English the short i (as in kit) has become centralised, leading to the phrase fish and chips sounding like "fush and chups" to the Australian ear. The words rarely and really, reel and real, doll and dole, pull and pool, witch and which, and full and fill can sometimes be pronounced as homophones. Some New Zealanders pronounce the past participles grown, thrown and mown using two syllables, whereas groan, throne and moan are pronounced as one syllable. New Zealanders often reply to a question or emphasise a point by adding a rising intonation at the end of the sentence.

Initially, the Māori language (te reo Māori) was permitted in native schools to facilitate English instruction, but as time went on official attitudes hardened against any use of the language. Māori were discouraged from speaking their own language in schools and work places and it existed as a community language only in a few remote areas. The language underwent a revival beginning in the 1970s, and now more people speak Māori. The future of the language was the subject of a claim before the Waitangi Tribunal in 1985. As a result, Māori was declared an official language in 1987. In the 2013 census, 21.3 percent of Māori people—and 3.7 percent of all respondents, including some non-Māori people—reported conversational fluency in the language. There are now Māori language immersion schools and two Māori Television channels, the only nationwide television channels to have the majority of their prime-time content delivered in Māori. Many places have officially been given dual Māori and English names in recent years.

In the 2018 census, 22,987 people reported the ability to use New Zealand Sign Language. It was declared one of New Zealand's official languages in 2006.

Samoan is the most widely spoken non-official language (2.2 percent), followed by "Northern Chinese" (including Mandarin; 2.0 percent), Hindi (1.5 percent) and French (1.2 percent). A considerable proportion of first- and second-generation migrants are multilingual.

Education

Education follows the three-tier model, which includes primary schools, followed by secondary schools (high schools) and tertiary education at universities or polytechnics. The Programme for International Student Assessment ranked New Zealand's education as the seventh highest in 2009. The Education Index, published with the UN's 2014 Human Development Index and based on data from 2013, listed New Zealand at 0.917, ranked second after Australia.

 there were 476,240 primary students, 278,266 secondary students, and 58,340 students attending composite (combined primary and secondary) schools. Primary and secondary schooling is compulsory for children aged 6 to 16 with most children starting at 5. Early leaving exemptions may be granted to 15-year-old students that have been experiencing some ongoing difficulties at school or are unlikely to benefit from continued attendance. Parents and caregivers can home school their children if they obtain approval from the Ministry of Education and prove that their child will be taught "as regularly and as well as in a registered school". There are 13 school years and attending state (public) schools is nominally free from an individual's fifth birthday until the end of the calendar year following their 19th birthday.

The academic year in New Zealand varies between institutions, but generally runs from late January until mid-December for primary and secondary schools and polytechnics, and from late February until mid-November for universities. New Zealand has an adult literacy rate of 99 percent, and over half of the population aged 15 to 29 hold a tertiary qualification. In the adult population 14.2 percent have a bachelor's degree or higher, 30.4 percent have some form of secondary qualification as their highest qualification and 22.4 percent have no formal qualification.

Religion

The predominant religion in New Zealand is Christianity. As recorded in the 2018 census, about 38 percent of the population identified themselves as Christians, although regular church attendance is estimated at 15 percent. Another 48.5 percent indicated that they had no religion (up from 41.9 percent in 2013 and 34.7 percent in 2006) and around 7.5 percent affiliated with other religions.

The indigenous religion of the Māori population was animistic, but with the arrival of missionaries from the early nineteenth century most of the Māori population converted to Christianity. In the 2018 census, 3,699 Māori identify themselves as adhering to "Māori religions, beliefs and philosophies".

In the 2018 census, the largest reported Christian affiliations are Anglican (6.7 percent of the population), Roman Catholic (6.3 percent), Presbyterian (4.7 percent). There are also significant numbers of Christians who identify themselves with Methodist, Pentecostal, Baptist and Latter-day Saint churches, and the New Zealand-based Rātana church has adherents among Māori. Immigration and associated demographic change in recent decades has contributed to the growth of minority religions, especially Hinduism, Buddhism and Islam.

Income

New Zealand's early economy was based on sealing, whaling, flax, gold, kauri gum, and native timber. During the 1880s agricultural products became the highest export earner and farming was a major occupation within New Zealand. Farming is still a major employer, with 75 000 people indicating farming as their occupation during the 2006 census, although dairy farming has recently taken over from sheep as the largest sector. The largest occupation recorded during the 2018 census was sales assistant with 108,702 people, followed by office managers (65,907 people), chief executives or managing directors (54,480 people), and sales representatives not elsewhere included (51,747 people). The largest industries of employment were cafes and restaurants (67,608 people), supermarkets and grocery stores (57,609 people), primary education (55,779 people), hospitals (52,887 people), and house construction (51,804 people). Most people earn their income from wages or salaries (60.6 percent), with the other sources of income being superannuation or pensions (17.3 percent), interest and investments (16.8 percent) and self-employment (14.8 percent).

In 1982 New Zealand had the lowest per-capita income of all the developed nations surveyed by the World Bank. In 2010 the estimated gross domestic product (GDP) at purchasing power parity (PPP) per capita was roughly US$28,250, between the thirty-first and fifty-first highest for all countries. The median personal income in 2006 was $24,400. This was up from $15,600 in 1996, with the largest increases in the $50,000 to $70,000 bracket. Men earn more than women on average, with the median income for men in 2011 being $31,500, $12,400 more than women. The highest median personal income were for people identifying with the European or "other" ethnic group, while the lowest was from the Asian ethnic group. The median income for people identifying as Māori was $20,900. In 2013, the median personal income had risen slightly to $28,500.

Unemployment peaked above 10 percent in 1991 and 1992, before falling to a record low of 3.7 percent in 2007 (ranking third from twenty-seven comparable OECD nations). Unemployment rose back to 7 percent in late 2009. In the June 2017 quarter, unemployment had fallen to 4.8 percent. This is the lowest unemployment rate since December 2008, after the start of the global financial crisis, when it was 4.4 percent. Most New Zealanders do some form of voluntary work, more women volunteer (92 percent) than males (86 percent). Home ownership has declined since 1991, from 73.8 percent to 66.9 percent in 2006.

See also

 Demographics of Auckland
 Demographics of the Cook Islands, associated with New Zealand
 Health in New Zealand
 Homelessness in New Zealand
 Housing in New Zealand
 List of cities in New Zealand
 New Zealand census
 Social class in New Zealand

Notes

References

Bibliography

External links 
 New Zealand's population clock

 
Ethnic groups in New Zealand
Immigration to New Zealand